George Jessel "Buddy" Curry (born June 4, 1958) is a former American college and professional football player who was a linebacker in the National Football League (NFL) for eight seasons from 1980 to 1987. He played college football for the University of North Carolina. A 2nd-round pick in the 1980 NFL Draft by the Atlanta Falcons, he and his Falcons teammate Al Richardson were selected as the 1980 NFL Defensive Rookie of the Year.

He is currently the head master trainer for USA Football's "Heads Up Football Program", which teaches youth athletes proper tackling techniques.

High school career
Buddy Curry was the defensive stalwart on Coach Alger Pugh's fine mid-1970s George Washington Eagles teams in Danville, VA.

College career

NFL career

In his rookie year, Curry co-shared the Defensive Rookie of the Year award with fellow Atlanta linebacker Al Richardson. In 1983, Curry made 229 tackles, which remains the most by a Falcons defender in a season, followed by Keith Brooking's 212 tackles in 2002. He blocked a field goal during a 26–14 victory against the Los Angeles Rams on October 12, 1986.

Personal life

His son, Jessel Curry was a 2009 recruit to the University of Auburn Tigers Football team. He also has another son named David Curry who is a Linebacker at Georgia Tech.  His daughter, Gaby plays libero for Kentucky.

References

1958 births
Living people
American football linebackers
North Carolina Tar Heels football players
Atlanta Falcons players
National Football League Defensive Rookie of the Year Award winners